Wikipedia has several lists of oldest buildings:

List of the oldest buildings in the world
Oldest buildings in Canada by province or territory
List of oldest buildings and structures in Toronto
List of oldest buildings and structures in Macau
Oldest buildings in the United Kingdom
Oldest buildings in Scotland
Oldest buildings in the United States
 List of the oldest buildings in Connecticut
 List of the oldest buildings in Delaware
 List of the oldest buildings in Massachusetts
 List of the oldest buildings in New Jersey
 List of the oldest buildings in New York
 List of the oldest buildings in Pennsylvania
 List of the oldest buildings in Rhode Island
 List of the oldest buildings in Virginia

See also
List of the oldest churches in the United States
List of the oldest churches in the world
List of the oldest mosques in the world
Oldest synagogues in the world